John Paul Bucyk (born May 12, 1935) is a Canadian former professional ice hockey left winger and member of the Hockey Hall of Fame. Having played most of his career with the Boston Bruins, he has been associated in one capacity or another with the Bruins' organization since the late 1950s. Nicknamed "Chief", Bucyk was named one of the '100 Greatest NHL Players' in 2017.

Early life
Bucyk was born in Edmonton to Sam and Pearl Bucyk, Ukrainian immigrants from the village of Butsiv, in what is now Yavoriv Raion, Lviv Oblast, Ukraine. The family was poor, with Pearl working two jobs and his father, Sam, was unemployed for over four years. His father died when Bucyk was 10 years old.

Playing career
Bucyk was a skilled left winger who was (at) the largest of his day.  While he never was regarded as the best at his position (being a contemporary of superstars Bobby Hull and Frank Mahovlich), he had a long and stellar career, and retired as the fourth leading point scorer of all time and having played the third-most games in history.  Despite his reputation for devastating hip checks, he was a notably clean player who won the Lady Byng Memorial Trophy for sportsmanship in 1971 and 1974.

Bucyk played junior hockey for four seasons for his hometown Edmonton Oil Kings before signing with the Detroit Red Wings in 1955. Two modest years later in 1957, he was traded to the Bruins in a surprising deal for Terry Sawchuk, one of the greatest goaltenders of the day. Bucyk became the top left wing in Boston playing with his Uke Line partners of Vic Stasiuk and Bronco Horvath, who had previously played together in Edmonton. Bucyk established himself as a durable winger who was strong in the corners with consistent scoring numbers.

However, thereafter the team fell on hard times in the 1960s, finishing in last place five straight seasons, during which time Bucyk — generally paired with centre Murray Oliver and winger Tommy Williams — led the team in scoring several times.  When the Bruins became a powerhouse in the late 1960s, Bucyk — by then the team captain — rose with the pack, with great production including a 51-goal season in the 1970–71 season in his mid-thirties, and helping the Bruins to win two Stanley Cup titles in 1970 and 1972. Bucyk proved particularly effective playing on the left side on Boston's greatly feared power-play unit, which featured Phil Esposito, John McKenzie, Bobby Orr and Fred Stanfield.

Bucyk starred into his penultimate season (during which he surrendered his team captaincy, while suffering an injury, to Wayne Cashman), and ended his playing career after the 1978 season, after which the Bruins retired his number #9 jersey. At the time of his retirement, Bucyk was fourth all-time in points (behind Gordie Howe, Esposito and Stan Mikita) and in goals.

He scored 545 goals as a Bruin, the most in franchise history. Only Ray Bourque has subsequently passed his team mark for points and assists.  Bucyk's 40 playoff goals for Boston places him seventh on the team's all-time list as of the end of the 2020–21 season. Bucyk scored exactly 100 playoff points for Boston, one of just seven Bruins to reach a three-figure total in this department. 

Bucyk remains affiliated with the Bruins, serving on various occasions as a broadcaster and in the front office. He previously served as  the team's director of road services, and is now listed by the team as ambassador. As part of Boston's coaching and administrative staff, Bucyk had his name engraved on the Stanley Cup for a third time with the Bruins in 2011, his 53rd consecutive season with the organization.  As of the 2023 season, Bucyk's 67 years in professional hockey is the longest such tenure on record.

Bucyk was inducted into the Hockey Hall of Fame in 1981.

Career statistics

Regular season and playoffs

* Stanley Cup Champion.

Achievements and facts
 Played in the NHL All-Star Game in 1955, 1963, 1964, 1965, 1968, 1970, 1971.
 Named to the NHL second All-Star team in 1968.
 Stanley Cup champion in 1970 and 1972.
 Won the Lady Byng Memorial Trophy in 1971 and 1974.
 Named to the NHL first All-Star team in 1971. 
Won Lester Patrick Trophy for contributions to hockey in the United States in 1977.
 Known as the "Chief" due to presumed Native American looks by a mistaken Boston cartoonist.
A Ukrainian Canadian and member of the "Uke" line with Bronco Horvath and Vic Stasiuk.
 When the Bruins ended their twenty-nine-year championship drought in 1970, Bucyk was given the honour of being the first player of the team to hoist the Stanley Cup around the Boston Garden, since he was the most senior Alternate Captain (the Bruins did not have a regular Captain wearing the "C" during these years).
 His nephew Randy Bucyk played for the Northeastern University Huskies and the Montreal Canadiens and Calgary Flames organizations, earning a Stanley Cup ring with Montreal in 1986. Randy Bucyk also played for the Canadian national team in 1989.
 Recorded sixteen twenty-goal seasons.
 Career leader in goals and consecutive games played for the Bruins; second to Ray Bourque in career games, assists and points (retired as the overall leader in all of those categories).
 Retired third behind Gordie Howe and Alex Delvecchio in all-time NHL games played; currently 13th.
 Retired as the leading career point scorer among left wings, a record since surpassed by Luc Robitaille.
 Oldest player to score 50 goals in one season (51 goals in 1970–71) at age 35, a record that stood until Alexander Ovechkin broke it by doing the same at age 36 in 2021–22. 
 Also oldest player scoring 50 or more for 1st time in career. (1970–71).
 Played the greatest number of NHL games before scoring 500 goals - 1,370.
 His #9 Jersey was retired by the Boston Bruins on March 13, 1980.
 Inducted into the Hockey Hall of Fame in 1981.
 In 1998, he was ranked number 45 on The Hockey News' list of the 100 Greatest Hockey Players.
 In January, 2017, Bucyk was part of the first group of players to be named one of the '100 Greatest NHL Players' in history.

See also
List of NHL statistical leaders
List of NHL players with 1000 points
List of NHL players with 500 goals
List of NHL players with 1000 games played

References

External links

1935 births
Living people
Boston Bruins captains
Boston Bruins players
Boston Bruins announcers
Canadian ice hockey left wingers
Canadian people of Ukrainian descent
Detroit Red Wings players
Edmonton Flyers (WHL) players
Edmonton Oil Kings (WCHL) players
Hockey Hall of Fame inductees
Lady Byng Memorial Trophy winners
Lester Patrick Trophy recipients
National Hockey League players with retired numbers
Ice hockey people from Edmonton
Stanley Cup champions